Enchanted Hills may refer to:

Enchanted Hills, California
Enchanted Hills, Indiana